The Headquarters of the Bank of the Argentine Nation, more often referred locally as Banco Nación Casa Central, is a monumental bank building next to the Plaza de Mayo, founding site of Buenos Aires and host of major events in the history of the country.

Designed by renowned Argentine architect Alejandro Bustillo in a Neoclassical style with French influences, the  building occupies an entire city block and was inaugurated in 1944.

With a dome  in diameter, the building is a National Historic Landmark.

History

The headquarters are located in the San Nicolás neighborhood of Buenos Aires on the site of the Teatro Colón's first building, bought by the national government in 1888 and later designated as main offices of the recently founded national bank. The edifice was remodeled in 1910 by architect Adolfo Büttner to better suit its new role.

In 1938 Alejandro Bustillo presented a new design for a much larger,  structure, which was built in two stages between 1940 and 1955. 

The building is also home to the Alejandro Bustillo Art Gallery, established in 1971, as well as to a historic and numismatic museum.

See also
 Headquarters of the Provincial Bank of Córdoba
 List of National Historic Monuments of Argentina
 Bank of the Argentine Nation

References

External links 

 Banco de la Nación Argentina 
 Casa Central del Banco de la Nación Argentina at Picasa Web Albums

Bank headquarters
Government buildings in Argentina
Government buildings completed in 1955
National Historic Monuments of Argentina
Neoclassical architecture in Argentina
1955 establishments in Argentina